Crazy World is the third studio album by American pop rock band Boys Like Girls. It marks a departure from the group's original emo and alternative rock sound in favor of a more country style. The Crazy World EP was released on July 17, 2012 with the tracks, "Be Your Everything", "Life of the Party" and "The First Time" to help promote the album. The album was released on December 11, 2012. On November 15, they posted a "Crazy World Song Reveal" page, allowing fans to share a link to it in order to unlock a new song off the new record. On November 16, the new track was revealed as "Stuck in the Middle", and the LP was made available for pre-order.

The lead single "Be Your Everything" was released in the summer of 2012, 
and entered the Billboard 
Hot Singles Sales chart at number 18. The album debuted and peaked at number 134 on the Billboard 200.

Reception

Crazy World received mixed reviews from critics. On Metacritic, the album received an average rating of 41, indicating generally "mixed or average reviews".

Track listings
All lyrics written by Martin Johnson.

Charts

References

External links

2012 albums
Boys Like Girls albums